Yevgeny Pavlovich Krylatov (23 February 1934 – 8 May 2019) was a Soviet and Russian composer who wrote songs for over 120 Soviet and Russian movies and animated films.

Biography
Krylatov was born on 23 February 1934 in Lysva in the working class family of Pavel Krylatov and his wife Zoya.

Krylatov graduated from Perm Music School in the Moscow Conservatory (1953–1959); having studied at once in two faculties: in the class of the composition with Professor Mikhail Chulaki and in the class of piano with Professor Vladimir Nathanson. After graduating he found himself impoverished, lacking work or a permit to reside in Moscow. He would go on to compose music for more than 150 feature and animated films.

He died in Moscow on May 8, 2019, survived by his daughter Maria.

Filmography (selection)
1961: Absolutely Seriously (Совершенно серьезно) with Anatoly Lepin and Nikita Bogoslovsky
1968: Film, Film, Film (Фильм, фильм, фильм) with Aleksandr Zatsepin
1969: Umka (Умка)
1970: Umka is Looking for a Friend (Умка ищет друга)
1970: About Love (О любви)
1971: Oh, That Nastya! (Ох уж эта Настя!)
1972: Property of the Republic (Достояние республики)
1973: Looking for a Man (Ищу человека)
1974: Woodpeckers Don't Get Headaches (Не болит голова у дятла)
1976: The Little Mermaid (Русалочка)
1978: Three from Prostokvashino (Трое из Простоквашино)
1979: The Adventures of the Elektronic (Приключения Электроника)
1979: Aquanauts (Акванавты)
1980: Do Not Part with Your Beloved (С любимыми не расставайтесь)
1982: Charodei (Чародеи)
1984: Guest from the Future (Гостья из будущего)
 1987: Lilac Ball (Лиловый шар)
1989: Don't Leave... (Не покидай...)
2011: Fairytale.Is (Сказка. Есть)

Awards
Krylatov was given several awards over the course of his career:

 The People's Artist of Russia in 1994 
 The Certificate of honor of the Moscow City Duma on February 18, 2004
 Given a Memorial sign on the "Square of Stars" on February 19, 2004
 Certificate of Honor of the Government of Moscow on March 3, 2009
 The Order of Honor on June 2, 2010
 an award from the president in 2015 for developments to Russian art

References

External links
Yevgeny Krylatov's official website 

1934 births
2019 deaths
20th-century Russian male musicians
21st-century Russian male musicians
People from Lysva
Moscow Conservatory alumni
Male film score composers
People's Artists of Russia
Recipients of the Lenin Komsomol Prize
Recipients of the Order of Honour (Russia)
Recipients of the USSR State Prize
Russian film score composers
Russian male composers
Soviet film score composers
Soviet male composers
Deaths from pneumonia in Russia